9Life is an Australian free-to-air digital television multichannel owned by Nine Entertainment. The channel airs mostly foreign lifestyle and reality programs, with the channel having a licensing agreement with Discovery Inc. (previously Scripps Networks Interactive) for the distribution of many formats.

History
The channel was first announced on 28 October 2015, and began broadcasting on 26 November 2015 in metropolitan areas on channel 94. 9Life replaced the main broadcast of datacasting channel Extra, which was moved to channel 95 to replace its timeshift channel Extra 2.

9Life began being included in the official OzTAM ratings on 1 December 2015, where it recorded a 2.3% primetime share, nearly double that of sister channel 9Gem, which has been the biggest channel launch since 9Go! in 2009.

NBN Television announced on 16 February 2016 on their website that they would carry 9Life from 1 March 2016 on channel 84.

Regional affiliate WIN Television announced on 10 February 2016 it would launch 9Life in the coming months. It was later confirmed the channel would launch on 1 March 2016 on channel 84. Four WIN regions were excluded from the 1 March launch date. Griffith, Tasmania, and Eastern South Australia did not receive the channel until 2 March 2016 due to technical issues. In addition, the Regional WA station did not launch the channel until 10 March 2016.

On 29 April 2016, Nine announced that it had signed a new affiliation deal with Southern Cross Austereo, dumping WIN Television as its primary affiliate starting 1 July 2016. Upon the switchover, 9Life became unavailable as WIN ceased broadcasting it and Southern Cross did not have the technical equipment to broadcast the channel. Three months later, the channel recommenced broadcasting in the Regional Queensland, Southern NSW/ACT and Regional Victoria markets on channel 54 on 17 July 2016. This left Regional WA, Tasmania, Mildura and Griffith without the service.

In 2017, 9Life began broadcasting in Darwin via Nine's O&O station, NTD.

On 30 September 2018, 9Life recommenced broadcasting to Tasmania, this time via TDT Tasmania, and it became available to the Spencer Gulf/Broken Hill region (via GTS/BKN) for the first time.

On 12 March 2021, Nine announced that it would return to WIN Television as its regional affiliate in most markets beginning on 1 July 2021, in a deal that will last at least seven years. From 1 August 2021, 9Life is available in regional areas via WIN Television on channel 83, which replaced Sky News on WIN. This returned the channel to Regional WA, Mildura and Griffith after an absence of five years.

Programming
The majority of programming comes from Discovery's lifestyle and reality shows produced for an American audience, some of which have already aired through the Foxtel and Fetch TV platforms.

Original programming

Current programming

 Come Dine with Me - UK (Also on 9Gem)
 The Bachelor U.S.
 The Bachelorette
 Bachelor in Paradise Australia
 Backyard Blitz
 Below Deck
 Big Rich Texas
 The Block (repeats)
 Dash Dolls
 Dance Moms (Also on 9Go!)
 Delish
 Escape to the Country (Also on 7Two)
 Fixer Upper
 Flip or Flop
 Flip or Flop Follow Up
 Flipping Out
 The Garden Gurus
 Getaway (repeats)
 Hollywood Medium with Tyler Henry (Also on 9Go!)
 Home of the Year
 House Hunters
 House Hunters International
 House Hunters Renovation
 House Hunters Off The Grid
 Hunting Vintage
 Island Hunters
 Keeping Up with the Kardashians
 Kourtney and Khloé Take The Hamptons
 Kourtney and Khloé Take Miami
 Kourtney and Kim Take Miami
 Kourtney and Kim Take New York
 Ladies of London
 Luxury Homes Revealed 
 Masters of Flip
 The Millionaire Matchmaker
 Million Dollar Listing Los Angeles
 Million Dollar Listing Miami
 Million Dollar Listing New York
 Million Dollar Listing San Francisco
 Mom’s A Medium
 Postcards (repeats) 
 Ready Set Reno
 The Real Housewives
 The Road to Miss Universe Australia 
 Room to Improve
 Texas Home Improvement with Jim Dutton
 The Texas Bucket List
 Tiny House Hunters
 Tiny House, Big Living
 Top Chef
 Vintage Flip
 WAGS
 WAGS Miami

Past

 The Block 2003
 The Block 2004
 The Block 2010
 The Block 2011
 The Block 2012
 The Block: Sky High
 The Block: Fans v Faves
 The Block: Glasshouse
 The Block: Triple Threat
 The Block 2016
 The Block 2017

Availability
9Life is available in standard definition in metropolitan areas through Nine Network owned-and-operated stations: TCN Sydney, GTV Melbourne, QTQ Brisbane, NWS Adelaide, STW Perth and NTD Darwin as well as NBN Northern New South Wales and other stations WIN Southern NSW/ACT, GTS/BKN Broken Hill NSW, AMN Griffith NSW, GTS/BKN Spencer Gulf SA, Port Augusta SA, SES/RTS Eastern SA, RTQ Regional QLD, VTV Regional VIC, STV Mildura, TVT Tasmania and WOW Regional WA.

The 9Life channel is not available in the Remote Central & Eastern TV market only.

Slogan
26 November 2015 – present: Starts Here

References

External links

English-language television stations in Australia
Nine Network
Television channels and stations established in 2015
2015 establishments in Australia
Digital terrestrial television in Australia